The Kennedys: After Camelot (also known as The Kennedys: Decline and Fall) is a 2017 American television drama miniseries based on the 2012 book After Camelot: A Personal History of the Kennedy Family 1968 to the Present by J. Randy Taraborrelli as a follow-up to the 2011 miniseries The Kennedys. Katie Holmes reprised her role as Jacqueline Kennedy Onassis, while Matthew Perry played Ted Kennedy, Alexander Siddig appeared as Aristotle Onassis and Kristen Hager as Joan Bennett Kennedy, Ted's wife. The two-part miniseries aired on Reelz on April 2, 2017, and April 9, 2017.

Cast
Katie Holmes as Jacqueline Kennedy Onassis
Matthew Perry as Ted Kennedy
Diana Hardcastle as Rose Kennedy
Kristen Hager as Joan Bennett Kennedy
Kristin Booth as Ethel Kennedy
Alexander Siddig as Aristotle Onassis
Erin Agostino as Christina Onassis
Chris Kapeleris as Alexander Onassis
Barry Pepper as Robert F. Kennedy
Brett Donahue as John F. Kennedy Jr.
Tom Wilkinson as Joseph P. Kennedy, Sr.
Erica Cox as Carolyn Bessette-Kennedy

Episodes

References

External links
 
 

2017 American television series debuts
2017 American television series endings
2010s American drama television miniseries
2010s American political television series
American biographical series
Films about the Kennedy family
Cultural depictions of John F. Kennedy
Cultural depictions of Robert F. Kennedy
Cultural depictions of Jacqueline Kennedy Onassis
Cultural depictions of Aristotle Onassis